The  is a national expressway in Mie Prefecture and Nara Prefecture, Japan. The expressway is also known as the Meihan National Highway that is a literal translation of its Japanese name. Together with the Nishi-Meihan Expressway and Higashi-Meihan Expressway, it is the central portion of a corridor linking the greater Nagoya and Osaka areas. It is owned and operated by Ministry of Land, Infrastructure, Transport and Tourism and is signed as an auxiliary route of National Route 25 as well as E25 under their "Expressway Numbering System."

Naming
Meihan is a Sino-Japanese pronunciation of two-character kanji acronym for Nagoya and Osaka (名阪). The first character of three-character kanji that represents Nagoya (名古屋) is pronounced as mei, whereas the second character of two-character kanji that represents Osaka (大阪) is pronounced as han.

History
Construction on the Meihan Expressway began in March 1962, with an intended construction period of only one thousand days. The rapid construction of expressways in Japan at the time was spearheaded by Minister of Construction Ichirō Kōno in preparation for the 1964 Summer Olympics in Tokyo. It was opened as a two-lane expressway in December 1965.

Interchange list

References

Expressways in Japan
Roads in Nara Prefecture
Roads in Mie Prefecture